The XXII Motorised Corps (XXII. Armeekorps (motorisiert)) was a German army corps during World War II. History 
The XXII. Armeekorps (motorisiert) was created on 26 August 1939 in Wehrkreis X (Schleswig-Holstein, Hamburg, Bremen). 
The Corps participated the next month in the Invasion of Poland, during which it broke through the southern wing of the Polish Army.

In May 1940, the High Command of the XXII Corps also received command over the XIV (von Wietersheim), XXXXI (Reinhardt) and XIX Army Corps (Guderian), and renamed as Panzergruppe von Kleist, was engaged in the Battle of France under command of Ewald von Kleist. It played a crucial role in the German victory, when it overwhelmed the French defenses at Sedan, and advanced west reaching the sea at Abbeville.

In June 1940, during Fall Rot, the second phase in the Battle of France, Panzergruppe von Kleist was in control of the XIV (von Wietersheim) and XVI Panzer Corps (Hoepner), and advanced as far as the Spanish border.  
 
In July 1940, the Corps was again renamed Generalkommando XXII. Armeekorps (motorisiert)''. 
 
On 16 November 1940 the XXII Corps was converted into Panzergruppe 1, still under command of Von Kleist.

Commanders
 Generaloberst Ewald von Kleist 
 Chief of Staff : Colonel Kurt Zeitzler

Area of operations
 Poland - September 1939 to October 1939
 France - June 1940 to July 1940

Sources 
 XXII. Armeekorps on Lexikon-der-wehrmacht.de

Army,22
Military units and formations established in 1939
Military units and formations disestablished in 1940